() is a county under the jurisdiction of the prefecture-level city of Quzhou in the west of Zhejiang Province, People's Republic of China, bordering Jiangxi Province to the southwest. The district's total area is 1099 square kilometers, and its population is 320,000 people. The district's postal code is 324200.  The district government is located at 29 Shengli Road, in the town of Tianma.

Administrative regions

The county administers seven towns, 14 rural villages, 11 residential areas, and 341 administrative villages.

Towns: Tianma, Zhaoxian, Huibu, Fangcun, Qiuchuan, Baishi, and Qingshi.

Rural villages: Hejia, Songfan, Donglu, Xinqiao, Jiarong, Xinchang, Jinyuan, Longrao, Tonggong, Qiankou, Daqiaotou, Wuli, Dong'an, and Gedi.

Climate

See also
Fujiang Village
Huangnitang Village, Changshan

References

County-level divisions of Zhejiang
Quzhou